Ans is a municipality and city of Wallonia located in the province of Liège, Belgium.

On January 1, 2006, Ans had a total population of 27,322. The total area is 23.35 km2 which gives a population density of 1,170 inhabitants per km2.  Its postal code is 4430.

Ans is the finish location of the road bicycle race Liège–Bastogne–Liège, the oldest of the classic cycle races held every April.

Ans is bounded with Liège, Seraing, Herstal, Saint-Nicolas and Flémalle, the agglomeration of Liège with 600,000 people.

Settlements
The municipality consists of the following districts:
Ans
Alleur
Loncin (other: Loncègn)
Xhendremael (other: Hin.n'mâle)

Population

Notable residents

 Léon Jeck (1947–2007), footballer, born in Ans
 Michel Daerden (1949–2012), politician, mayor of Ans 1993–2011
 Victor Larock (1904–1977), politician, born in Ans
 Annie Servais-Thysen (1933–2022), politician, born in Xhendremael, Ans

Twinnings

Since 1999, the twinnings with the Pays d'Ans association with Périgord.  This association contains six municipalities and all with the descendants of Ans: Badefols-d'Ans, La Boissière-d'Ans, Chourgnac d’Ans, Granges-d'Ans, Sainte-Eulalie-d'Ans and Saint-Pantaly-d'Ans.

See also
 List of protected heritage sites in Ans

References

External links 
 
  - Only available in French

 
Municipalities of Liège Province